Jane Louise Elizabeth Krentz (born December 24, 1952) is an American politician in the state of Minnesota. She served in the Minnesota State Senate.

References

1952 births
Living people
Minnesota state senators
Women state legislators in Minnesota
21st-century American women